Highway 4, known as the Ingraham Trail, extends from Yellowknife, Northwest Territories to Tibbitt Lake, approximately  east of Yellowknife. It was built in the mid-1960s as the first leg of a 'road to resources' with the original intention of encircling Great Slave Lake.

The highway is designated as a northern/remote route of Canada's National Highway System.

The Ingraham Trail serves as both an industrial and recreational highway. The trail is also known as Yellowknife's cottage country, with the bulk of seasonal and year-round cabins located between Cassidy Point and Prelude Lake Territorial Park. During the winter road program, B-train tractor trailers travel the road, four loads every 20 minutes, 24 hours a day.

Although it serves primarily recreational activities and area residences in this lake-dotted country, after the ice break-up on Great Slave Lake, the highway is the only access to Dettah from Yellowknife.

For about a month in late winter, a winter road to Lac de Gras is opened to trucking of mining supplies, the junction being along the Ingraham Trail. The road condition has suffered due to its frequent use by heavy trucks. This is shown on the first season of the American reality television series, Ice Road Truckers, which airs on History. The Tibbitt to Contwoyto Winter Road also extends from the end of the Ingraham Trail to Contwoyto Lake in Nunavut, forming Nunavut's only connection to the road network in the rest of Canada.

The Ingraham Trail is named after Vic Ingraham, a pioneer Yellowknife businessman of the 1930s–40s.

Yellowknife has experienced an aurora borealis tourism boom the last few years and the Ingraham Trail is the prime viewing location. It is common to come across aurora rush after midnight during the peak aurora season, November to March.

Details

After this the road passes several territorial parks:

 Yellowknife River Territorial Park 
 Dettah turnoff
 Prosperous Lake Territorial Park
 Madeline Lake Territorial Park
 Pontoon Lake Territorial Park
 Prelude Lake Territorial Park (
 Hidden Lake Territorial Park
 Powder Point Day Use Area )
 Cameron River Falls Day Use Area/Hiking Trail Access
 Cameron River Crossing
 Reid Lake Territorial Park 

before reaching Tibbitt Lake.

The trail is chipsealed to Reid Lake, leaving the last  as gravel.

References

External links
1934 Vic Ingraham and Speed II NWT Historical Timeline, Prince of Wales Northern Heritage Centre
Ingraham Trail History

Northwest Territories territorial highways
Gravel roads